The 2005–06 Vancouver Canucks season was the Canucks' 36th NHL season.

In the first season after the lockout, the Canucks were expected to fare as well, if not better, than the previous season, where they captured the Northwest Division title. However, as the season went along, several key players were hampered by injuries and the team failed to meet expectations, ultimately missing the playoffs. As a result, coach Marc Crawford was fired, and the team underwent numerous changes over the summer.

Regular season

Final standings

Schedule and results

|- align="center" bgcolor="#bbffbb" 
| 1 || October 5 || Phoenix || 2 – 3 || Vancouver || || Cloutier || 18,630 || 1–0–0 || 2 || 
|- align="center" bgcolor="#ffdddd" 
| 2 || October 8 || Vancouver || 3 – 4 || Edmonton || SO || Cloutier || 16,839 || 1–0–1 || 3 || 
|- align="center" bgcolor="#bbffbb"  
| 3 || October 10 || Vancouver || 4 – 2 || Detroit || || Auld || 20,066 || 2–0–1 || 5 || 
|- align="center" bgcolor="#ffbbbb" 
| 4 || October 12 || Vancouver || 0 – 6 || Minnesota || || Cloutier || 18,568 || 2–1–1 || 5 || 
|- align="center" bgcolor="#bbffbb"  
| 5 || October 14 || Vancouver || 5 – 3 || Minnesota || || Cloutier || 18,568 || 3–1–1 || 7 || 
|- align="center" bgcolor="#bbffbb"   
| 6 || October 16 || Dallas || 2 – 5 || Vancouver || || Auld || 18,630 || 4–1–1 || 9 || 
|- align="center" bgcolor="#bbffbb"   
| 7 || October 18 || Chicago || 2 – 6 || Vancouver || || Cloutier || 18,630 || 5–1–1 || 11 || 
|- align="center" bgcolor="#bbffbb"  
| 8 || October 20 || Phoenix || 2 – 3 || Vancouver || || Cloutier || 18,630 || 6–1–1 || 13 || 
|- align="center" bgcolor="#bbffbb"   
| 9 || October 22 || Colorado || 4 – 6 || Vancouver || || Cloutier || 18,630 || 7–1–1 || 15 || 
|- align="center" bgcolor="#bbffbb"   
| 10 || October 25 || Vancouver || 3 – 1 || Minnesota || || Auld || 18,568 || 8–1–1 || 17 || 
|- align="center" bgcolor="#ffbbbb" 
| 11 || October 27 || Vancouver || 2 – 6 || Colorado || || Cloutier || 18,007 || 8–2–1 || 17 || 
|- align="center" bgcolor="#ffdddd" 
| 12 || October 29 || Vancouver || 3 – 4 || Colorado || OT || Auld || 18,007 || 8–2–2 || 18 || 
|-

 
|- align="center" bgcolor="#bbffbb"  
| 13 || November 2 || Minnesota || 1 – 2 || Vancouver || || Auld || 18,630 || 9–2–2 || 20 || 
|- align="center" bgcolor="#bbffbb"
| 14 || November 4 || Columbus || 3 – 5 || Vancouver || || Auld || 18,630 || 10–2–2 || 22 || 
|- align="center" bgcolor="#ffbbbb" 
| 15 || November 5 || Vancouver || 0 – 1 || Calgary  || || Auld || 19,289 || 10–3–2 || 22 || 
|- align="center" bgcolor="#ffbbbb" 
| 16 || November 7 || Vancouver || 3 – 4 || Calgary || || Auld || 19,289 || 10–4–2 || 22 || 
|- align="center" bgcolor="#ffbbbb" 
| 17 || November 10 || Colorado || 5 – 3 || Vancouver || || Auld || 18,630 || 10–5–2 || 22 || 
|- align="center" bgcolor="#bbffbb" 
| 18 || November 13 || Detroit || 1 – 4 || Vancouver || || Cloutier || 18,630 || 11–5–2 || 24 || 
|- align="center" bgcolor="#bbffbb" 
| 19 || November 16 || Vancouver || 3 – 1 || San Jose || || Cloutier || 17,139 || 12–5–2 || 26 || 
|- align="center" bgcolor="#ffbbbb" 
| 20 || November 17 || Vancouver || 4 – 5 || Los Angeles || || Cloutier || 18,118 || 12–6–2 || 26 || 
|- align="center" bgcolor="#bbffbb"
| 21 || November 20 || Vancouver || 3 – 2 || Anaheim || || Cloutier || 14,149 || 13–6–2 || 28 || 
|- align="center" bgcolor="#bbffbb" 
| 22 || November 22 || Chicago || 1 – 3 || Vancouver || || Auld || 18,630 || 14–6–2 || 30 || 
|- align="center" bgcolor="#bbffbb" 
| 23 || November 24 || San Jose  || 2 – 3 || Vancouver || || Auld || 18,630 || 15–6–2 || 32 || 
|- align="center" bgcolor="#ffbbbb" 
| 24 || November 26 || Vancouver || 1 – 2 || Phoenix || || Auld || 18,095 || 15–7–2 || 32 || 
|- align="center" bgcolor="#ffbbbb" 
| 25 || November 27 || Vancouver || 2 – 6 || Colorado || || Auld || 18,007 || 15–8–2 || 32 || 
|- align="center" bgcolor="#bbffbb" 
| 26 || November 30 || Colorado || 2 – 5 || Vancouver || || Auld || 18,630 || 16–8–2 || 34 || 
|-

|- align="center" bgcolor="#ffbbbb" 
| 27 || December 1 || Vancouver || 3 – 5 || Edmonton || || Auld || 16,839 || 16–9–2 || 34 || 
|- align="center" bgcolor="#bbffbb"
| 28 || December 4 || Boston || 2 – 5 || Vancouver || || Auld || 18,630 || 17–9–2 || 36 || 
|- align="center" bgcolor="#bbffbb" 
| 29 || December 9 || Ottawa || 2 – 3 || Vancouver || SO || Auld || 18,630 || 18–9–2 || 38 || 
|- align="center" bgcolor="#bbffbb" 
| 30 || December 13 || Vancouver || 3 – 2 || Rangers || || Auld || 18,200 || 19–9–2 || 40 || 
|- align="center" bgcolor="#bbffbb" 
| 31 || December 15 || Vancouver || 5 – 4 || Philadelphia || || Auld || 19,549 || 20–9–2 || 42 || 
|- align="center" bgcolor="#ffdddd"
| 32 || December 17 || Edmonton || 5 – 4 || Vancouver || OT || Ouellet || 18,630 || 20–9–3 || 43 || 
|- align="center" bgcolor="#ffdddd"
| 33 || December 19 || Los Angeles || 4 – 3 || Vancouver || SO || Auld || 18,630 || 20–9–4 || 44 || 
|- align="center" bgcolor="#ffbbbb" 
| 34 || December 21 || Edmonton || 7 – 6 || Vancouver || || Auld || 18,630 || 20–10–4 || 44 || 
|- align="center" bgcolor="#ffdddd" 
| 35 || December 23 || Calgary || 6 – 5 || Vancouver || SO || Auld || 18,630 || 20–10–5 || 45 || 
|- align="center" bgcolor="#ffbbbb" 
| 36 || December 26 || Calgary || 2 – 1 || Vancouver || || Auld || 18,630 || 20–11–5 || 45 || 
|- align="center" bgcolor="#bbffbb"
| 37 || December 28 || Nashville || 3 – 4 || Vancouver || || Auld || 18,630 || 21–11–5 || 47 || 
|- align="center" bgcolor="#ffbbbb"
| 38 || December 31 || Vancouver || 3 – 4 || Minnesota || || Ouellet || 18,568 || 21–12–5 || 47 || 
|-

|- align="center" bgcolor="#ffbbbb" 
| 39 || January 2 || Vancouver || 1 – 4 || St. Louis || || Auld || 14,230 || 21–13–5 || 47 || 
|- align="center" bgcolor="#ffbbbb"
| 40 || January 4 || Vancouver || 1 – 3 || Dallas || || Auld || 17,227 || 21–14–5 || 47 || 
|- align="center" bgcolor="#bbffbb"
| 41 || January 5 || Vancouver || 3 – 2 || Chicago || || Auld || 11,125 || 22–14–5 || 49 || 
|- align="center" bgcolor="#bbffbb" 
| 42 || January 7 || Calgary || 3 – 4 || Vancouver || OT|| Auld || 18,630 || 23–14–5 || 51 || 
|- align="center" bgcolor="#bbffbb"
| 43 || January 10 || Toronto || 3 – 4 || Vancouver || || Auld || 18,630 || 24–14–5 || 53 || 
|- align="center" bgcolor="#ffbbbb" 
| 44 || January 13 || Vancouver || 0 – 3 || New Jersey || || Auld || 15,061 || 24–15–5 || 53 || 
|- align="center" bgcolor="#bbffbb" 
| 45 || January 14 || Vancouver || 8 – 1 || Islanders || || Auld || 14,205 || 25–15–5 || 55 || 
|- align="center" bgcolor="#bbffbb" 
| 46 || January 16 || Vancouver || 4 – 2 || Pittsburgh || || Auld || 15,681 || 26–15–5 || 57 || 
|- align="center" bgcolor="#bbffbb" 
| 47 || January 19 || Buffalo || 1 – 4 || Vancouver|| || Auld || 18,630 || 27–15–5 || 59 || 
|- align="center" bgcolor="#bbffbb"
| 48 || January 21 || Montreal || 2 – 6 || Vancouver|| || Auld || 18,630 || 28–15–5 || 61 || 
|- align="center" bgcolor="#ffbbbb" 
| 49 || January 23 || Vancouver || 0 – 4 || St. Louis || || Ouellet || 13,138 || 28–16–5 || 61 || 
|- align="center" bgcolor="#ffbbbb" 
| 50 || January 24 || Vancouver || 5 – 6 || Columbus || || Auld || 16,192 || 28–17–5 || 61 || 
|- align="center" bgcolor="#ffbbbb" 
| 51 || January 26 || Vancouver || 1 – 2 || Detroit || || Auld || 20,066 || 28–18–5 || 61 || 
|- align="center" bgcolor="#bbffbb" 
| 52 || January 28 || Vancouver || 4 – 3 || Colorado || SO || Auld || 18,007 || 29–18–5 || 63 || 
|- align="center" bgcolor="#bbffbb"
| 53 || January 31 || Vancouver || 7 – 4 || Phoenix || || Auld || 14,599 || 30–18–5 || 65 || 
|-

|- align="center" bgcolor="#bbffbb" 
| 54 || February 3 || Vancouver || 3 – 1 || Calgary || || Auld || 19,289 || 31–18–5 || 67 || 
|- align="center" bgcolor="#ffbbbb" 
| 55 || February 4 || Vancouver || 1 – 3 || Edmonton || || Auld || 16,839 || 31–19–5 || 67 || 
|- align="center" bgcolor="#bbffbb"
| 56 || February 6 || Columbus || 4 – 7 || Vancouver || || Auld || 18,630 || 32–19–5 || 69 || 
|- align="center" bgcolor="#ffbbbb" 
| 57 || February 8 || St. Louis || 4 – 2 || Vancouver || || Auld || 18,630 || 32–20–5 || 69 || 
|- align="center" bgcolor="#ffbbbb" 
| 58 || February 10 || Anaheim || 3 – 1 || Vancouver || || Auld || 18,630 || 32–21–5 || 69 || 
|- align="center" bgcolor="#bbffbb" 
| 59 || February 12 || Minnesota || 2 – 3 || Vancouver || OT || Auld || 18,630 || 33–21–5 || 71 || 
|- align="center" bgcolor="#bbffbb" 
| 60 || February 28 || Vancouver || 2 – 1 || Calgary || || Auld || 19,289 || 34–21–5 || 73 || 
|-

|- align="center" bgcolor="#ffbbbb" 
| 61 || March 2 || Vancouver || 1 – 3 || Nashville || || Auld || 13,228 || 34–22–5 || 73 || 
|- align="center" bgcolor="#bbffbb" 
| 62 || March 3 || Vancouver || 5 – 4 || Chicago || SO || Auld || 11,579 || 35–22–5 || 75 || 
|- align="center" bgcolor="#ffbbbb" 
| 63 || March 5 || St. Louis || 4 – 1 || Vancouver || || Auld || 18,630 || 35–23–5 || 75 || 
|- align="center" bgcolor="#ffdddd" 
| 64 || March 9 || Nashville || 3 – 2 || Vancouver || OT || Auld || 18,630 || 35–23–6 || 76 || 
|- align="center" bgcolor="#ffbbbb" 
| 65 || March 11 || Dallas || 2 – 1 || Vancouver || || Auld || 18,630 || 35–24–6 || 76 || 
|- align="center" bgcolor="#ffbbbb" 
| 66 || March 13 || Vancouver || 2 – 4 || Dallas || || Auld || 18,584 || 35–25–6 || 76 || 
|- align="center" bgcolor="#ffbbbb" 
| 67 || March 14 || Vancouver || 0 – 5 || Nashville || || Noronen || 13,353 || 35–26–6 || 76 || 
|- align="center" bgcolor="#bbffbb" 
| 68 || March 17 || Vancouver || 3 – 2 || Columbus || || Auld || 16,163 || 36–26–6 || 78 || 
|- align="center" bgcolor="#ffbbbb" 
| 69 || March 19 || Detroit || 7 – 3 || Vancouver || || Auld || 18,630 || 36–27–6 || 78 || 
|- align="center" bgcolor="#bbffbb"
| 70 || March 21 || Vancouver || 4 – 1 || Edmonton || || Auld || 16,839 || 37–27–6 || 80 || 
|- align="center" bgcolor="#bbffbb" 
| 71 || March 23 || Edmonton || 3 – 4 || Vancouver || SO || Auld || 18,630 || 38–27–6 || 82 || 
|- align="center" bgcolor="#ffbbbb"
| 72 || March 25 || Vancouver || 2 – 3 || Edmonton || || Auld || 16,839 || 38–28–6 || 82 || 
|- align="center" bgcolor="#bbffbb" 
| 73 || March 27 || Los Angeles || 4 – 7 || Vancouver || || Auld || 18,630 || 39–28–6 || 84 || 
|- align="center" bgcolor="#bbffbb" 
| 74 || March 29 || Minnesota || 1 – 2 || Vancouver || || Auld || 18,630 || 40–28–6 || 86 || 
|- align="center" bgcolor="#ffdddd" 
| 75 || March 31 || Minnesota || 2 – 1 || Vancouver || SO || Auld || 18,630 || 40–28–7 || 87 || 
|-

|- align="center" bgcolor="#ffbbbb" 
| 76 || April 2 || Vancouver || 2 – 6 || Anaheim || || Auld || 17,174 || 40–29–7 || 87 || 
|- align="center" bgcolor="#ffbbbb" 
| 77 || April 3 || Vancouver || 0 – 1 || Los Angeles || || Auld || 17,196 || 40–30–7 || 87 || 
|- align="center" bgcolor="#bbffbb" 
| 78 || April 8 || Calgary || 2 – 3 || Vancouver || OT || Auld || 18,630 || 41–30–7 || 89 || 
|- align="center" bgcolor="#ffbbbb" 
| 79 || April 10 || Anaheim || 4 – 2 || Vancouver || || Auld || 18,630 || 41–31–7 || 89 || 
|- align="center" bgcolor="#ffdddd" 
| 80 || April 12 || San Jose || 3 – 2 || Vancouver || OT || Auld || 18,630 || 41–31–8 || 90 || 
|- align="center" bgcolor="#ffbbbb" 
| 81 || April 13 || Vancouver || 3 – 5 || San Jose || || Auld || 17,496 || 41–32–8 || 90 || 
|- align="center" bgcolor="#bbffbb" 
| 82 || April 15 || Colorado || 3 – 4 || Vancouver || OT || Noronen || 18,630 || 42–32–8 || 92 || 
|-

|-
| Legend:

Player statistics

Scoring
 Position abbreviations: C = Centre; D = Defence; G = Goaltender; LW = Left Wing; RW = Right Wing
  = Joined team via a transaction (e.g., trade, waivers, signing) during the season. Stats reflect time with the Canucks only.
  = Left team via a transaction (e.g., trade, waivers, release) during the season. Stats reflect time with the Canucks only.

Goaltending
  = Joined team via a transaction (e.g., trade, waivers, signing) during the season. Stats reflect time with the Canucks only.

Awards and records

Awards

Milestones

Transactions
The Canucks were involved in the following transactions from February 17, 2005, the day after the 2004–05 NHL season was officially cancelled, through June 19, 2006, the day of the deciding game of the 2006 Stanley Cup Finals.

Trades

Players acquired

Players lost

Signings

Draft picks
Vancouver's picks at the 2005 NHL Entry Draft in Ottawa, Ontario.

Farm teams

Manitoba Moose
AHL affiliate that is based in Winnipeg, Manitoba and their home arena is the MTS Centre. The team has been affiliated with the Vancouver Canucks since 2000.

Columbia Inferno
ECHL affiliate that is based in Columbia, South Carolina and their home arena is the Carolina Coliseum. The team has been affiliated with the Vancouver Canucks since 2001.

Notes

References

Vancouver Canucks seasons
Vancouver C
Vancouver